The Licensing Act 1872  (35 & 36 Vict c 94) is an Act of the Parliament of the United Kingdom. It is one of the Licensing Acts 1828 to 1886 and was one of the Licensing (Ireland) Acts 1833 to 1886. It enacted various regulations and offences relating to alcohol, particularly licensing of premises. Most parts of the Act have been superseded by more recent Licensing Acts, but some parts remain in force. In particular, the Act creates an offence of being drunk in public with a maximum fine of level 1 on the standard scale (£200 ); and of being drunk in a public place while in charge of a horse, a cow (or other cattle), a steam engine, or a carriage, or in possession of a loaded firearm, with a possible penalty of a fine of up to level 1 on the standard scale or 51 weeks in prison. "Carriage" has been interpreted as including mobility scooters, though exemptions apply under the Chronically Sick and Disabled Persons Act 1970; bicycles are covered by their own offence in the Road Traffic Act 1988.

This Act:

restricted the closing times in public houses to midnight in towns and 11 o'clock in country areas.
regulated the content of beer – one of the most common practices was to add salt to the beer, which increased thirst and therefore sales as well.
said that licensing hours were to be determined by local authorities.
gave boroughs the option of becoming completely 'dry' i.e. banning all alcohol.

These policies were enforced by the police.

It was an unpopular Act for the working classes and there were a number of near riots when police tried to enforce closing hours. Brewers resented what they saw as an attack on their independence and profits; others disliked the Act because it interfered with personal liberty.

See also
Cundy v Le Cocq

Further reading
 Lowe, Norman, Mastering Modern British History, Macmillan Press LTD, 1998

References

External links

UK Legislation 

United Kingdom Acts of Parliament 1872
Alcohol law in the United Kingdom